Murnau Ort station is a railway station in the municipality of Murnau am Staffelsee, in Bavaria, Germany. It is located on the Ammergau Railway of Deutsche Bahn. The double-tracked Munich–Garmisch-Partenkirchen railway passes underneath directly west of the station platform.

Services
 the following services stop at Murnau Ort:

References

External links
 
 Murnau Ort layout 
 

Railway stations in Bavaria
Buildings and structures in Garmisch-Partenkirchen (district)